Something in the Wind is a 1947 American musical comedy film directed by Irving Pichel and starring Deanna Durbin, Donald O'Connor, and John Dall.

Durbin's third husband Charles David said she "hated" making her last three films and that she would watch all her old movies except those three.

Plot
The film is about the grandson of a recently deceased millionaire who mistakes a beautiful female disc jockey for her aunt, who once dated his grandfather. It was O'Connor's first film after he returned from military service in World War II. The film includes the famous "I Love a Mystery" number performed by O'Connor.

Cast
 Deanna Durbin as Mary Collins
 Donald O'Connor as Charlie Read
 John Dall as Donald Read
 Charles Winninger as Uncle Chester Read
 Helena Carter as Clarissa Prentice
 Margaret Wycherly as Grandma Read
 Jean Adair as Aunt Mary Collins
 The Williams Brothers as Singing Quartet
 Jacqueline deWit as Fashion Show Saleslady 
 Jan Peerce as Tony, the Policeman
 Bess Flowers as Woman in Audience (uncredited)
 Andy Williams as himself (uncredited)

Production
The film was based on an original story by Fritz Rotter and Charles O'Neal called For the Love of Mary. Universal bought it in August 1946 and William Bowers did the script. In December the studio announced it as Deanna Durbin's next vehicle. Irving Pichel would direct for producer Joseph Sistrom. Filming was to begin in January - the film substituted Up in Central Park in Durbin's schedule because the latter required color and there was a delay with the Technicolor lab.
 In January John Dall and Donald O'Connor were cast. It was O'Connor's first film after he got out of the army. Filming started February 1947. It was the second film for Helena Carter.

In April 1947 the film was retitled Something in the Wind.

References

External links
 
 
 
Review of film at Variety

1947 films
1947 musical comedy films
Films directed by Irving Pichel
Universal Pictures films
American musical comedy films
Films with screenplays by Harry Kurnitz
American black-and-white films
1940s American films